Rhodope-Evros Super-prefecture was one of three super-prefectures of Greece.

It consisted of Rhodope Prefecture in the west and Evros Prefecture in the east.

See also
 Western Thrace
 Thrace Prefecture

Former subdivisions of Greece
Western Thrace